The 1989 Virginia Slims of Los Angeles was a women's tennis tournament played on outdoor hard courts at the Manhattan Country Club in Manhattan Beach, California in the United States that was part of the Category 5 tier of the 1989 WTA Tour. It was the 16th edition of the tournament and was held from August 7 through August 13, 1989. First-seeded Martina Navratilova won the singles title, her sixth at the event.

Finals

Singles

 Martina Navratilova defeated  Gabriela Sabatini 6–0, 6–2
 It was Navratilova's 5th singles title of the year and the 143th of her career.

Doubles

 Martina Navratilova /  Wendy Turnbull defeated  Mary Joe Fernández /  Claudia Kohde-Kilsch 5–2 (Fernández and Kohde-Kilsch retired)
 It was Navratilova's 9th title of the year and the 290th of her career. It was Turnbull's only title of the year and the 58th of her career.

References

External links
 ITF tournament edition details
 Tournament draws

Virginia Slims of Los Angeles
LA Women's Tennis Championships
Sports competitions in Manhattan Beach, California
Virginia Slims of Los Angeles
Virginia Slims of Los Angeles
Virginia Slims of Los Angeles
Virginia Slims of Los Angeles